The Sardinian regional election of 1984 took place on 24 June 1984.

One more seat was added.

After the election Mario Melis, leader of the Sardinian Action Party, a nationalist social-liberal outfit, formed a government with the support of the Italian Communist Party, the Italian Socialist Party and, since 1985, the Italian Democratic Socialist Party.

Results

Sources: Regional Council of Sardinia and Istituto Cattaneo

References

Elections in Sardinia
1984 elections in Italy
June 1984 events in Europe